Ruth Lommel (1918–2012) was a German stage and film actress. She was the daughter of the actor Ludwig Manfred Lommel. Her brother Ulli Lommel also became an actor, while another brother Manuel Lommel is a cinematographer.

She was married to the racing driver Emil Vorster.

Selected filmography
 The Unfaithful Eckehart (1940)
 Riding for Germany (1941)
 The Swedish Nightingale (1941)
 The Big Game (1942)
 When Men Cheat (1950)
 Harbour Melody (1950)
 The Mill in the Black Forest (1953)
 Hooray, It's a Boy! (1953)
 The Immenhof Girls (1955)
 Two Bavarians in St. Pauli (1956)
 Between Munich and St. Pauli (1957)
 The Muzzle (1958)

References

Bibliography
 Giesen, Rolf. Nazi Propaganda Films: A History and Filmography. McFarland, 2003.

External links

1918 births
2012 deaths
German film actresses
German stage actresses
Actors from Wrocław